Centene Stadium is a stadium in Great Falls, Montana.  It is named for the Centene Corporation which paid for the naming rights to the stadium.  It is primarily used for baseball, and is the home field of the Great Falls Voyagers independent minor league baseball team.  It was built in 1940 and holds 4,000 people. The ballpark has a picnic area and a BBQ area.  Field dimensions are 335 to right field, 328 to left field, 415 to center field, and 368 to each power alley.

The baseball park is owned by the City of Great Falls and leased to the Great Falls Baseball Club, Inc., which is a non-profit organization.  In exchange for maintaining the park and updates, the city requires that the three local high school (American Legion affiliated) teams be allowed to practice and play in the stadium as long as it does not interfere with the operations of the Great Falls Voyagers.

The three American Legion Baseball teams that play in the park are the Great Falls Chargers AA, Chargers A and Chargers B.  The previous names of these teams where the Great Falls Stallions, the Great Falls Electrics, and the Great Falls Chargers.  (The programs all merged into one organization thus the new name).

External links
Centene Stadium - Great Falls Voyagers
Centene Stadium Views - Ball Parks of the Minor Leagues

Baseball venues in Montana
Buildings and structures in Great Falls, Montana
Tourist attractions in Great Falls, Montana
1940 establishments in Montana
Sports venues completed in 1940
Sports in Great Falls, Montana